Callum Joshua Ryan O'Dowda  (born 23 April 1995) is an Irish professional footballer who plays as a left winger for EFL Championship club Cardiff City. and the Republic of Ireland national team.

Club career

Oxford United
O'Dowda is a product of the Oxford United youth academy, which he joined when he was nine. His performances for the academy in the 2012–13 season led him being awarded a Young Player of the Year award, after which he was offered his first professional contract with the club, keeping him for two years with a further one-year option.

After making an impression in a pre-season friendly, O'Dowda made his professional debut on 6 August 2013 in a League Cup first-round tie against Charlton Athletic. His league debut came as a substitute versus Southend United in a League Two fixture on 6 October 2013. In his first season at Oxford United, O'Dowda made 13 appearances for the club in all competitions.

The 2014–15 season proved to be a breakthrough for O'Dowda, with his first-team opportunities increased by new manager Michael Appleton. He scored his first league goal for Oxford United against Exeter City on 13 September 2014, a goal that was nominated for Goal of the Season. Between 17 January 2015 and 31 January 2015, he scored two goals in three games, against Southend United and Stevenage respectively. O'Dowda signed a three-year contract with the club in February. A few weeks later, he scored his fourth goal, in a 1–0 win over Bury on 7 March 2015. O'Dowda finished the 2014–15 season having made 39 league appearances and scoring four times.

O'Dowda made a promising start to the 2015–16 season, scoring twice in his first five league appearances, against Notts County and Yeovil Town. He began to attract interest from other clubs, though no bid was received. O'Dowda scored two more goals at the end of 2015, against Accrington Stanley in the league and Yeovil Town in the Football League Trophy. He scored three more goals in the second half of the season, the first against Notts County and then twice against Barnet. On 3 April 2016 he scored Oxford's first goal in the final of the Football League Trophy at Wembley Stadium, though Oxford ultimately lost 3–2 to Barnsley. Nine days later, he scored his seventh league goal of the season, in a 5–1 win over Crawley Town. O'Dowda scored the final goal in a 3–0 victory against Wycombe Wanderers on 7 May 2016 that secured Oxford United's promotion to League One. Despite international commitments and injuries, O'Dowda finished the season with 38 league appearances (20 as a substitute) and 8 league goals.

Bristol City
On 14 July 2016, O'Dowda signed for Football League Championship side Bristol City for an undisclosed fee of around £1.25 million, potentially rising to £1.6 million depending on incentives. He signed on a three-year contract. Upon signing for Bristol City, O'Dowda said that had been a difficult decision to leave his hometown club. O'Dowda scored his first goal for Bristol City against Crystal Palace in the EFL Cup 4th Round on 24 October 2017. 11 days later, O'Dowda scored the opener, his first league goal for Bristol City, in a 2–1 victory against Cardiff City.

Amidst rumoured interest in the player from Leeds United, on 17 January 2019, Bristol activated a clause in O'Dowda's contract to extend it until the end of the 2019/20 season.

In September 2019 he signed a new three-year contract with Bristol City. O'Dowda was released from the club in May 2022 after his contract expired after spending six years at the club.

Cardiff City
On 8 June 2022, it was announced O'Dowda would join Championship club Cardiff City on a three-year deal on 1 July.

International career
In March 2015, O'Dowda was called up by Republic of Ireland U21 after becoming eligible for the national team through his late grandfather, Brendan O'Dowda, a famous Irish tenor who was born in Dundalk. O'Dowda told the club's website "I am very proud and very excited to have the call up. It is a privilege to be included. I was approached a few weeks ago to see if I would be interested because of my family's Irish background. I jumped at the chance and can't wait to be involved."

O'Dowda made his Ireland U21 debut on 26 March 2015, playing 90 minutes, in a 1–0 win over Andorra U21. He scored his first goal for the U21s in a qualifying match for the 2017 U21 European Championships on 28 March 2016, the only Irish goal in a 3–1 defeat to Slovenia.

On 12 May 2016, he received his first call up to the Republic of Ireland senior squad. He made his début for Ireland on 31 May, coming on as a second-half substitute in a 2–1 defeat to Belarus. However, on 31 May 2016, O'Dowda was among few players to be cut from the UEFA Euro 2016 squads.

On 9 October 2016, he made his competitive debut in a World Cup qualifier in Moldova, coming on as a second-half substitute for Shane Long.

Personal life
His sister Jade O'Dowda is a track and field athlete who competed for England at the 2022 Commonwealth Games in the heptathlon.  his Grandfather was notable Irish Tenor Brendan O'Dowda

Career statistics

Club

International

References

1995 births
Living people
People from Kidlington
Footballers from Oxfordshire
Republic of Ireland association footballers
English footballers
English people of Irish descent
Oxford United F.C. players
Bristol City F.C. players
Cardiff City F.C. players
English Football League players
Association football wingers
Republic of Ireland youth international footballers
Republic of Ireland international footballers
Republic of Ireland under-21 international footballers